Sergei Grigorievich Svatikov (Russian: Серге́й Григо́рьевич Сва́тиков; 1880 – 25 January 1942) was a Russian historian and political figure who presented critical evidence and/or testimony in 1935 in the Berne Trial regarding the notorious Protocols of Zion.

See also
Berne Trial
Henryk Baran
Protocols of Zion

External links
 

1880 births
1942 deaths
French people of Russian descent
20th-century Russian journalists